Vladimír Kocman (born 5 April 1956 in České Budějovice) is a Czech former judoka who competed in the 1980 Summer Olympics.

References

External links
 
 

1956 births
Living people
Czech male judoka
Czechoslovak male judoka
Olympic judoka of Czechoslovakia
Olympic bronze medalists for Czechoslovakia
Olympic medalists in judo
Judoka at the 1980 Summer Olympics
Medalists at the 1980 Summer Olympics
Sportspeople from České Budějovice